Kabashima or Kabajima or variation may refer to:

Places
 Kabashima, Nagasaki (かばしま), a Japanese island off the southern coast of Nagasaki Prefecture; also known as Kabajima
  (かばしま), an island in the Gotō Islands archipelago of Japan; also known as Kabajima
 4998 Kabashima, a minor planet

People with the surname
,  Japanese politician
 (born 1939), Japanese amateur astronomer and author, namesake of 4998 Kabashima
, Japanese choreographer

Fictional characters
 , a fictional character from Major 2nd

See also

 Kaba (disambiguation)
 Shima (disambiguation)
 Jima (disambiguation)

Japanese-language surnames